Kiss Kiss Bang Bang is the second studio album by Italian singer and rapper Baby K, released on 11 September 2015 by Sony Music, produced by the Italian duo Takagi & Ketra.

Description  
Produced by the duo Takagi & Ketra, the album was preceded by the singles "Anna Wintour" and "Roma-Bangkok" (the last one is a duet with the Italian singer Giusy Ferreri) and who succeeded nationally, conquering the first position in Top Singles and being certified nine times platinum,   Diving the best-selling single in Italy in 2015  and from 2010 to today. The third and fourth singles from the album are "Chiudo gli occhi e salto", released in October 2015, and "Venerdì" released in June 2016 to end the promotions of the album.

Track listing

Charts

References

2015 albums